North Musi Rawas Regency ( abbreviation Muratara) is a regency of South Sumatra Province, Indonesia. It takes its name from the two main river which drain that area, Musi River and Rawas River. This regency was created on 10 June 2013 by splitting off the seven northernmost districts of Musi Rawas Regency.

The new regency borders Jambi province to the north, Musi Banyuasin Regency to the east, Musi Rawas Regency to the south, and Bengkulu province to the west. It covers an area of 6,008.66 km2 and had a population of 169,432 at the 2010 Census and 188,861 at the 2020 Census. The administrative centre is the town of Rupit.

Administrative districts
The new Regency comprises seven of the districts (kecamatan) which were previously part of Musi Rawas Regency. These seven districts are listed below with their areas and their populations at the 2010 Census and 2020 Census, together with the locations of the district administrative centres:

References

External links
 

Regencies of South Sumatra